Applause is a 1944 Greek drama film directed by George Tzavellas.

Cast 
 Kleon Triantafyllou ( Attik )  -  Alfa
 Zinet Lakaz - Nora
 Dimitris Horn - Stefanos
 Alekos Alexandrakis

References

External links 

1944 drama films
1944 films
Greek drama films
Greek black-and-white films